Jarantowice  (until 1874 Jerrentowitz) is a village in the administrative district of Gmina Wąbrzeźno, within Wąbrzeźno County, Kuyavian-Pomeranian Voivodeship, in north-central Poland.

Notable residents
Paul Wegener (1874–1948), actor

References

Villages in Wąbrzeźno County